Kathryn Mary (Kathi) Irvine is an American research statistician for the United States Geological Survey (USGS), affiliated with the Bozeman Environmental and Ecological Statistics Research Group, at the USGS Northern Rocky Mountain Science Center in Bozeman, Montana. Her research involves environmental statistics including both the fundamentals of spatial statistics and its application to wildlife populations including bats, pikas, elk, pine trees, and sagebrush steppes.

Education and career
Irvine majored in biology at the University of North Carolina at Chapel Hill. She has a master's degree in ecology and environmental sciences from the University of Maine, and a second master's degree and PhD in statistics from Oregon State University, completed in 2007. Her dissertation, Graphical models for multivariate spatial data, was supervised by Alix Gitelman.

She became an assistant professor at Montana State University in 2008 before moving to the USGS in 2011. Beyond the USGS, she is a member of the core planning team of the North American Bat Monitoring Program, and maintains an affiliate faculty position in statistics at Montana State University.

Service and recognition
Irvine was the 2018 chair of the American Statistical Association (ASA) Section on Statistics and the Environment, has been president of the Montana Chapter of the ASA several times, and has been publications chair for the ASA Section on Government Statistics. She was named a Fellow of the American Statistical Association in 2021.

References

External links

Year of birth missing (living people)
Living people
American statisticians
American women statisticians
University of North Carolina at Chapel Hill alumni
University of Maine alumni
Oregon State University alumni
Montana State University faculty
United States Geological Survey personnel
Fellows of the American Statistical Association
21st-century American women
Spatial statisticians